Vicari is a surname. Notable people with the surname include:

Andrew Vicari (1938–2016), Welsh painter
Frank Vicari (1931–2006), American jazz saxophonist
Franziska Seidl (née Vicari, 1892–1983), Austrian physicist
Hermann von Vicari (1773–1868), German archbishop
Lisa Vicari (born 1997), German actress
Salvatore Vicari (born 1981), Italian footballer